"101" is a song written by American musician Prince (using his pseudonym Joey Coco) for Scottish-born British singer Sheena Easton. The song appeared on Easton's ninth studio album The Lover in Me (1988), and was released in 1989 as the third single from The Lover in Me album.

Charts

Weekly charts

References

1988 songs
1989 singles
Sheena Easton songs
Songs written by Prince (musician)
Song recordings produced by Prince (musician)
MCA Records singles